Tammie Green (born December 17, 1959) is an American professional golfer.

Amateur career
Green was born in Somerset, Ohio. She attended Marshall University, where she played golf and basketball. She won four collegiate events, three during her senior year. She earned low-amateur honors at the 1981 LPGA Wheeling Classic.

Professional career
She started her professional career on the Futures Tour, on which she won 11 tournaments and was Player of the Year in 1985 and 1986.  In 1986, she qualified for the LPGA Tour by finishing tied for second at the LPGA Final Qualifying Tournament. She was LPGA Tour Rookie of the Year in 1987.  She was named Most Improved Player by Golf Digest in 1989. She won seven times on the LPGA Tour, including one major championship, the 1989 du Maurier Classic. Her best placing on the money list was 5th in 1997, which was one of four top ten seasons. She played for the United States in the Solheim Cup in 1994 and 1998. She was a member of the LPGA Tour Player Executive Committee from 1992–94. In 2004, she was inducted into the Ohio Golf Hall of Fame.

Professional wins (21)

LPGA Tour (7)

LPGA Tour playoff record (2–3)

LPGA of Japan Tour (1)
1988 Karuizawa 72 Tokyu Ladies Open

Futures Tour (11)
1985 (4) Prescott Open, Decatur Visitors Bureau Classic, Seven-up Classic, Salisbury Classic
1986 (7) Bonita Bay Classic, Jupiter West Classic, Tapatio Springs Classic, St. George Open, Western Colorado Classic, Magna/Millikin Bank Classic, Salisbury Classic

Other (2)
1994 Diner's Club Matches (with Kelly Robbins)
1995 Diner's Club Matches (with Kelly Robbins)

Major championships

Wins (1)

Team appearances
Professional
Solheim Cup (representing the United States): 1994 (winners), 1998 (winners)

References

External links

American female golfers
LPGA Tour golfers
Winners of LPGA major golf championships
Solheim Cup competitors for the United States
Golfers from Ohio
Marshall Thundering Herd women's golfers
Marshall Thundering Herd women's basketball players
People from Somerset, Ohio
1959 births
Living people